is a former Japanese football player. He manager of FC Gifu.

Playing career
Ueno was born in Mooka on November 1, 1973. After graduating from University of Tsukuba, he joined newly was promoted to J1 League club, Avispa Fukuoka in 1996. He became a regular player from first season. In 2000, he moved to Sanfrecce Hiroshima. However he could hardly play in the match. In 2001, he moved to J2 League club Kyoto Purple Sanga. He played many matches and the club won the champions in 2001 and was promoted to J1 from 2002. In 2003, he moved to J2 club Albirex Niigata. He became played as regular player and the club won the champions in 2003 and was promoted to J1 from 2004. In 2006, he moved to Sanfrecce Hiroshima again. Although he played many matches in 2006, he could not play at all in the match in 2007. In June 2007, he moved to his local club Tochigi SC in Japan Football League. He played as regular player in 2 seasons and the club was promoted to J2 from 2009. However he retired end of 2008 season.

Coaching career
Ueno was member of the technical team that oversaw Japan's campaign at the 2022 World Cup in Qatar.

On 15 December 2022, Ueno appointment manager of J3 club, FC Gifu for upcoming 2023 season.

Club statistics

Managerial statistics
.

References

External links

1973 births
Living people
University of Tsukuba alumni
Association football people from Tochigi Prefecture
Japanese footballers
Japanese football managers
J1 League players
J2 League players
Japan Football League players
Avispa Fukuoka players
Sanfrecce Hiroshima players
Kyoto Sanga FC players
Albirex Niigata players
Tochigi SC players
J3 League managers
FC Gifu managers
Association football forwards